The Cathedral Parish of Saint John the Baptist, or simply Kalibo Cathedral, is a Roman Catholic cathedral church. The cathedral is the seat of the Diocese of Kalibo.

History 

The cathedral stands as the oldest edifice of worship in the province of Aklan. The mission in Kalibo was founded by the Augustinians in 1581. Saint John the Baptist was chosen as the patron saint when the Kalibo mission was promoted into a parish in 1680.

A church was constructed in Laguinbanua but when the town transferred site to its present location in 1804, another church was erected which is the cathedral at present. In 1826, both the church and convent were completed. On May 24, 1885, a massive fire razed the town including the convent which was reconstructed the following year, 1886.

In 1947, after the World War II, Gabriel M. Reyes, Archbishop of Cebu and later of Manila, personally took a hand in the church reconstruction and remodeling. In 1976, the parish church of Kalibo elevated into a cathedral when the Diocese of Kalibo was erected. On June 14, 1990, an intensity 7.1 earthquake hit Panay Island at 3:41 P.M. with the epicenter at Culasi. The cathedral that is made of bricks suffered cracks on its walls. Then Kalibo Bishop Gabriel V. Reyes, restored and improved the church to accommodate more pilgrims who come to celebrate the feast of the Santo Niño.

Retaining some of the lines characteristic of the post-war church that alludes to earlier church styles, the cathedral of Kalibo is of modern construction. Its architectural design was crafted by the renowned national artist Leandro V. Locsin. Though the principal patron and titular of Kalibo is John the Baptist, the center of attention in this church is the image of the Santo Niño, in whose honor the annual Ati-atihan is celebrated every January.

References

External links 
 Facebook page 

Buildings and structures in Aklan
Spanish Colonial architecture in the Philippines
Roman Catholic cathedrals in the Philippines
1581 establishments in the Spanish Empire
1804 establishments in the Spanish Empire
19th-century Roman Catholic church buildings in the Philippines
20th-century Roman Catholic church buildings in the Philippines
Kalibo